Anna Elizabeth Moschovakis is a Greek American poet, author, and translator.

Early life 
Moschovakis was born to an American mother and a Greek father. She split her time growing up between the U.S. and Greece, where her father owned what she described as "a small apartment in a port-side suburb on the outskirts of Athens". She has one brother. She received a BA in philosophy from the University of California at Berkeley, an MFA from the Milton Avery Graduate School of the Arts at Bard College, and an MA in comparative literature (French and American) from the CUNY Graduate Center.

Career
Moschovakis is a founding member of Bushel Collective and the publishing collective Ugly Duckling Presse. She is a faculty member of Bard College's Milton Avery Graduate School of the Arts, as well as an adjunct associate professor in the Writing MFA program at Pratt Institute. Her writing has appeared in The Paris Review, The Believer and The Iowa Review.

Moschovakis' book of poetry, You and Three Others Are Approaching a Lake, won the James Laughlin Award in 2011. Her first novel, Eleanor, or, The Rejection of the Progress of Love, was published in 2018 and was called "remarkable" by the Los Angeles Review of Books. 

Moschovakis translated David Diop's 2018 novel At Night All Blood Is Black from French into English. The author and Moschovakis were awarded the 2021 International Booker Prize.

Personal life 
Moschovakis lives in South Kortright, New York.

Bibliography

Poetry 
 I Have Not Been Able to Get Through to Everyone (2006)
 You and Three Others Are Approaching a Lake (2011)
 They and We Will Get Into Trouble for This (2016)

Novels 
  Eleanor, or, The Rejection of the Progress of Love (2018)
  Participation (2022)

Translations
 The Engagement by Georges Simenon (2007)
 The Possession by Annie Ernaux (2008)
 The Jokers by Albert Cossery (2010)
 Commentary by Marcelle Sauvageo (2013, with Christine Schwartz Hartley)
 Bresson on Bresson (2017)
At Night All Blood Is Black by David Diop (2020)

Awards and honors
 Edward F. Albee Foundation (2001)
 New York Foundation for the Arts fellowship (2009)
Howard Fellowship from Brown University's Howard Foundation (2015)
Los Angeles Times Fiction Book Prize (2020)
International Booker Prize (Translation) (2021)

References

External links 
 Personal website

Living people
American poets
American translators
Bard College faculty
American women poets
21st-century American poets
21st-century American women writers
American women academics
Year of birth missing (living people)
American people of Greek descent
International Booker Prize winners